Monster Ballads Volume 2 is the sequel to Monster Ballads. Like its predecessor, it is a compilation album of many power ballads.

Track listing
"I Won't Forget You" - Poison - 3:38 
"Love of a Lifetime" - FireHouse - 4:50 
"When the Children Cry" - White Lion - 4:21 
"Miles Away" - Winger - 4:13 
"Love Is on the Way" - Saigon Kick - 4:27 
"More Than Words Can Say" - Alias - 3:55 
"Sometimes She Cries" - Warrant - 4:46 
"House of Pain" - Faster Pussycat - 5:48 
"Price of Love" - Bad English - 4:49 
"Only Time Will Tell" - Nelson - 4:19 
"Amanda" - Boston - 4:19 
"The Ballad of Jayne" - L.A. Guns - 4:36 
"Eyes Without a Face" - Billy Idol - 4:11 
"This Could Be the Night" - Loverboy - 5:00 
"Honestly" - Stryper - 4:08 
"Can't Fight This Feeling" - REO Speedwagon - 4:48

2001 compilation albums
Heavy metal compilation albums
Razor & Tie compilation albums